Smack On You is the debut album by Finnish rock band Smack, released in 1984. A remastered version was released in 1997 and it included five bonus tracks.

Singles 
 "Criminal"
 "Little C**t"

Track listing

Original album 
 "Good Morning Headache" (Manchuria, Claude) – 2:33
 "Run Rabbit Run" (Manchuria, Claude) – 2:22
 "Through the Glass" (Manchuria, Claude) – 4:01
 "Skin Alley" (Manchuria, Claude) – 2:41
 "Little C**t" (Manchuria, Claude) – 2:30
 "Completely Alone" (Manchuria, Claude, Cardong) – 4:23
 "Some Fun" (Manchuria, Claude) – 1:51
 "Ten Foot Cell" (Manchuria, Claude) – 3:46
 "Primitive" (Manchuria, Claude) – 2:15
 "Cemetery Walls" (Manchuria, Claude) – 3:47
 "Criminal" (Manchuria, Claude) – 3:17
 "No Peace on Earth" (Manchuria, Claude) – 1:23

1997 bonus tracks 
 "Criminal" – 3:15
 "Little C**t" – 2:04
 "Walkin' on the Wire" (Manchuria, Claude, Smack) – 4:20
 "Blank" (Manchuria, Rane, Claude, Smack) – 2:48
 "I Wanna Be Your Dog" (The Stooges) – 3:51

Personnel 
 Claude – vocals
 Manchuria – guitar
 Kartsa – guitar
 Cheri – bass guitar
 Kinde – drums

Charts

References

External links 
 Smack

1984 albums
Smack (Finnish band) albums